Marcelo Palomino (born May 21, 2001) is an American professional soccer player who plays as an attacking midfielder for Superettan side AFC Eskilstuna.

Career

Youth 
Palomino joined the Houston Dynamo academy when he was 11 years old. Whilst with the Dynamo academy, Palomino was named Dynamo Academy Player of the Year for three consecutive seasons between 2016 and 2018. He spent parts of the 2017 and 2018 seasons with Houston's Premier Development League affiliate side Brazos Valley Cavalry, scoring 7 goals in 8 appearances for the club, helping them to the PDL Mid-South Division title in 2018.  He also spent time training with the Dynamo first team regularly in 2017 and 2018.

In 2019, after turning 18, Palomino turned down contract offers from the Dynamo to pursue an opportunity in Europe, going on trials with Portuguese club FC Porto, German club TSV 1860 Munich, and others.

Professional

Houston Dynamo 
On January 6, 2019, Palomino signed with Major League Soccer side Houston Dynamo as a homegrown player. He made his professional debut on October 3, 2020, appearing as a 77th-minute substitute during a 2–1 loss to Sporting Kansas City. Palomino finished the 2020 season having made 3 appearances, all as a substitute,  for the Dynamo.

On March 3, 2021, Palomino joined USL Championship club Charlotte Independence on loan for the 2021 season. He made his debut for Charlotte on May 1 in a 3–0 defeat against the Tampa Bay Rowdies. In the next game, on May 14, Palomino scored his first goal for the Independence against Charleston Battery, his 12th-minute goal being the first in a 3–0 victory.  He ended the regular season with 6 goals and 1 assist in 31 appearances, helping Charlotte finish 2nd in the Atlantic Division and qualify for the playoffs.  After not appearing in Charlotte's first playoff game, he came on as a late substitute in their 2nd, a 1–0 loss to Louisville City in the conference semifinals.

Palomino made 2 Open Cup appearances for the Dynamo in 2022, but primarily played for Houston Dynamo 2 in MLS Next Pro, where he scored 7 goals and had 2 assists in 18 appearances.

AFC Eskilstuna 
On January 9, 2023, Palomino joined Swedish club AFC Eskilstuna on a permanent deal, signing a four-year contract.

Career Statistics

References

External links 
 Marcelo Palomino Houston Dynamo bio
 Houston Dynamo USSDA bio

2001 births
Living people
American soccer players
Soccer players from Houston
Association football midfielders
United States men's youth international soccer players
Brazos Valley Cavalry FC players
Houston Dynamo FC players
Charlotte Independence players
AFC Eskilstuna players
American expatriate sportspeople
Expatriate footballers in Sweden
American expatriate sportspeople in Sweden
Major League Soccer players
Homegrown Players (MLS)
MLS Next Pro players
USL League Two players
Superettan players